Erin Brockovich (née Pattee; born June 22, 1960) is an American paralegal, whistleblower, consumer advocate, and environmental activist who was instrumental in building a case against Pacific Gas & Electric Company (PG&E) involving groundwater contamination in Hinkley, California with the help of attorney Ed Masry in 1993. Their successful lawsuit was the subject of the Oscar-winning film, Erin Brockovich (2000), starring Julia Roberts as Brockovich and Albert Finney as Masry. Since then, Brockovich has become a media personality as well, hosting the TV series Challenge America with Erin Brockovich on ABC and Final Justice on Zone Reality. She is the president of Brockovich Research & Consulting. She also works as a consultant for the New York law firm of Weitz & Luxenberg, which has a focus on personal injury claims for asbestos exposure, and Shine Lawyers in Australia. She worked as a consultant for the now-defunct California law firm Girardi & Keese.

Early life
Brockovich was born Erin Pattee in Lawrence, Kansas, the daughter of Betty Jo (born O'Neal;  1923–2008), a journalist, and Frank Pattee (1924–2011), an industrial engineer and football player. She has two brothers, Frank Jr. and Thomas (1954–1992), and a sister, Jodie. She graduated from Lawrence High School, then attended Kansas State University, in Manhattan, Kansas, and graduated with an Associate in Applied Arts Degree from Wade College in Dallas, Texas.
Brockovich is dyslexic.

Pacific Gas & Electric litigation

In 1993, Brockovich became a whistleblower when she spoke out against PG&E after finding widespread unexplained illness in the town of Hinkley, California. She became instrumental in suing the utility company on behalf of the town.
The case (Anderson, et al. v. Pacific Gas & Electric, file BCV 00300) alleged contamination of drinking water with hexavalent chromium (also written as "chromium 6", "chromium VI", "Cr-VI" or "Cr-6") in the town. At the center of the case was a facility, the Hinkley compressor station, built in 1952 as a part of a natural-gas pipeline connecting to the San Francisco Bay Area. Between 1952 and 1966, PG&E used hexavalent chromium in a cooling tower system to fight corrosion. The waste water was discharged to unlined ponds at the site, and some of the waste water percolated into the groundwater, affecting an area of approximately  near the plant. The Regional Water Quality Control Board (RWQCB) put the PG&E site under its regulations in 1968.

The case was settled in 1996 for (US) $333 million, the largest settlement ever paid in a direct-action lawsuit in United States history to that date. Masry & Vititoe, the law firm for which Brockovich was a legal clerk, received $133.6 million of that settlement, and Brockovich received $2.5 million as part of her fee.

A study released in 2010 by the California Cancer Registry showed that cancer rates in Hinkley "remained unremarkable from 1988 to 2008". An epidemiologist involved in the study said that the 196 cases of cancer reported during the most recent survey of 1996 through 2008 were fewer than what he would expect based on demographics and the regional rate of cancer. However, in June 2013, Mother Jones magazine featured a critique from the Center for Public Integrity of the author's work on the later epidemiological studies.

, average Cr-6 levels in Hinkley were still peaking at 100 times California's maximum contaminant level for the compound at over 1,000 parts per billion.

In 2021, PG&E said that they had cleaned up 70% of the contamination. An independent consultant responsible for monitoring the cleanup on behalf of the residents said that groundwater cleanups take 30 to 50 years to complete.

In October 2022, the EPA announced Cr-6 was likely carcinogenic if consumed in drinking water. The American Chemistry Council disputed their finding.

Other litigation
Working with Edward L. Masry, a lawyer based in Thousand Oaks, California, Brockovich went on to participate in other anti-pollution lawsuits. One suit accused the Whitman Corporation of chromium contamination in Willits, California. Another, which listed 1,200 plaintiffs, alleged contamination near PG&E's Kettleman Hills compressor station in Kings County, California, along the same pipeline as the Hinkley site. The Kettleman suit was settled for $335 million in 2006.

In 2003, after experiencing problems with mold contamination in her own home in the Conejo Valley, Brockovich received settlements of $430,000 from two parties, and an undisclosed amount from a third party, to settle her lawsuit alleging toxic mold in her Agoura Hills, California, home. Brockovich then became a prominent activist and educator in the area as well.

Brockovich and Masry filed suit against the Beverly Hills Unified School District in 2003, in which the district was accused of harming the health and safety of its students by allowing a contractor to operate a cluster of oil wells on campus. Brockovich and Masry alleged that 300 cancer cases were linked to the oil wells. Subsequent testing and epidemiological investigation failed to corroborate a substantial link, and Los Angeles County Superior Court Judge Wendell Mortimer granted summary judgment against the plaintiffs. In May 2007, the school district announced that it was to be paid $450,000 as reimbursement for legal expenses.

Brockovich assisted in the filing of a lawsuit against Prime Tanning Corp. of St. Joseph, Missouri, in April 2009. The lawsuit claims that waste sludge from the production of leather, containing high levels of hexavalent chromium, was distributed to farmers in northwest Missouri to use as fertilizer on their fields. It is believed to be a potential cause of an abnormally high number of brain tumors around the town of Cameron, Missouri. Prior to the lawsuit, the site was investigated by the EPA and at the time, the agency found "no detections of total chromium", and added, "we would like to get any specific information from this law firm as soon as we can so we can evaluate it, and we intend to ask for that directly." The EPA, Missouri Department of Natural Resources, Missouri Department of Health and a state epidemiologist had been investigating what residents believed were a high number of brain tumors in the area — more than 70 since 1996. The epidemiologist had stated the numbers did not seem abnormally high. 

In June 2009, Brockovich began investigating a case of contaminated water in Midland, Texas. "Significant amounts" of hexavalent chromium were found in the water of more than 40 homes in the area, some of which have now been fitted with state-monitored filters on their water supply. Brockovich said: "The only difference between here and Hinkley is that I saw higher levels here than I saw in Hinkley."

In 2012, Brockovich became involved in the mysterious case of 14 students from LeRoy, New York, who began reporting perplexing medical symptoms, including tics and speech difficulties.  Brockovich believed environmental pollution from the 1970 Lehigh Valley Railroad derailment was the cause and conducted testing in the area. Brockovich was supposed to return to LeRoy to present her findings, but never did; in the meantime, the students' doctors determined the cause was mass psychogenic illness, and that the media exposure was exacerbating the symptoms. No environmental causes were found after repeat testing, and the students improved once the media attention died down.

In early 2016, Brockovich became involved in potential litigation against Southern California Gas for a large methane leak from its underground storage facility near the community of Porter Ranch, north of Los Angeles.

In early 2023, within hours of the Feb. 3 Norfolk Southern train derailment in East Palestine, Ohio, Brockovich started getting calls for assistance from the community about the toxic chemical fires. She has been interviewed on various news outlets, from independent media to national networks. A few weeks later, Brockovich traveled to East Palestine, where she was interviewed by local media, and appeared at one of several high-profile town hall meetings on Friday night, Feb. 24th. At the meeting, Brockovich and an attorney highlighted decades of toxic chemical train derailments. Among Brockovich's many concerns is the potential groundwater contamination after chemicals were, as she describes it, dumped in a big hole in the ground and burned off. A recurring theme from her appearances is that the nation has, for decades, in the name of profits over people, continued to put off necessary infrastructure improvements, tighter regulations and better response to protect the health, safety and welfare of communities from long-term bodily harm and environmental damage. Brockovich continues to cite the Hinkley case and Flint water crisis, as well as the 2013 Lac-Megantic, Canada oil train catastrophe.

Awards
 Honorary Doctor of Laws and commencement speaker at Lewis & Clark Law School, Portland, Oregon, in May 2005
 Honorary Doctor of Humane Letters and commencement speaker at Loyola Marymount University, Los Angeles, California, on May 5, 2007
 Honorary Master of Arts, Business Communication, from Jones International University, Centennial, Colorado

Movies and television
Brockovich's work in bringing litigation against Pacific Gas & Electric was the focus of the 2000 feature film Erin Brockovich, starring Julia Roberts in the title role. The film was nominated for five Academy Awards: Best Actress in a Leading Role, Best Actor in a Supporting Role, Best Director, Best Picture, and Best Writing in a Screenplay Written Directly for the Screen. Roberts won the Academy Award for Best Actress for her portrayal of Erin Brockovich. Brockovich herself had a cameo role as a waitress named Julia R.

Brockovich had a more extensive role in the 2012 documentary Last Call at the Oasis, which focused on not only water pollution but also the overall state of water scarcity as it relates to water policy in the United States.

On April 8, 2021, Rebel, a television series which creator Krista Vernoff loosely based on Brockovich's life, premiered on ABC.

Books and articles
Brockovich's first book, Take It from Me: Life's a Struggle But You Can Win, was published in 2001. A second book, Superman's Not Coming, was released on August 25, 2020.

In 2021, Brockovich wrote about hormone-disrupting chemicals (such as PFAS) decimating human fertility at an alarming rate.

On February 8, 2022, Brockovich wrote an article talking about the case of Steven Donziger, a lawyer who won a $18 billion judgment against Chevron before being jailed for contempt of court after refusing to turn his phone and computer over to Chevron's legal team.

Personal life
Brockovich has three children: a son, Matthew, and a daughter, Katie, from her first marriage to Shawn Brown, and a daughter, Elizabeth ("Beth"), from her second marriage to Steven Brockovich. Her third husband was actor and country-musician DJ, Eric L. Ellis. As of 2016, Brockovich resides in Agoura Hills, California, in a house she purchased in 1996 with her US$2.5 million bonus after the Hinkley settlement.

References

External links

 Official website of Erin Brockovich
 The Brockovich Report  BrockovichBlog.com
 Brockovich Village
 Official MySpace of Erin Brockovich
 Erin Brockovich biography on the Biography Channel
 
  Evening with Erin Brockovich in Sydney, hosted by the Climate Change Coalition 2007
 Detail about Hinkley case at AwesomeStories.com
 Did Hinkley Residents Really Win? at salon.com
 Weitz & Luxenberg PC
 Shine Lawyers Australia
 Environmental Justice Society
 Erin Brockovich video produced by Makers: Women Who Make America

1960 births
Living people
American environmentalists
Kansas State University alumni
People from Lawrence, Kansas
People from Agoura Hills, California
Pacific Gas and Electric Company
Activists from California
American women environmentalists
21st-century American women
People with dyslexia